Stefania Ascari (born 3 May 1980) is an Italian politician from the Five Star Movement. She has been a member of the Italian Chamber of Deputies from Emilia-Romagna since 2018.

See also 
 List of members of the Italian Chamber of Deputies, 2018–2022

References

External links 

Living people
1980 births
20th-century Italian politicians
20th-century Italian women politicians
21st-century Italian politicians
21st-century Italian women politicians
Deputies of Legislature XVIII of Italy
Five Star Movement politicians
Women members of the Chamber of Deputies (Italy)